Tragon is a genus of longhorn beetles of the subfamily Lamiinae, containing the following species:

 Tragon lugens (White, 1858)
 Tragon mimicus (Bates, 1890)
 Tragon pulcher Breuning, 1942
 Tragon signaticornis (Chevrolat, 1855)
 Tragon silaceoides Lepesme, 1952
 Tragon suturalis (Pascoe, 1864)

References

Pachystolini